Marta González Crivillers (born 9 April 1995) is a Spanish swimmer. She competed in the women's 4 × 100 metre freestyle relay event at the 2016 Summer Olympics.

References

External links
 

1995 births
Living people
Olympic swimmers of Spain
Swimmers at the 2016 Summer Olympics
Mediterranean Games silver medalists for Spain
Mediterranean Games bronze medalists for Spain
Mediterranean Games medalists in swimming
Swimmers at the 2018 Mediterranean Games
Spanish female freestyle swimmers